Church of the Holy Communion may refer to

 Church of the Holy Communion (St. Peter, Minnesota), listed on the National Register of Historic Places in Nicollet County, Minnesota
 Church of the Holy Communion (Norwood, New Jersey), listed on the National Register of Historic Places in Bergen County, New Jersey
 Church of the Holy Communion (Dallas), a Reformed Episcopal Church cathedral in Texas
 Church of the Holy Communion and Buildings, a deconsecrated church in Manhattan, New York City